Hako may refer to:

People
 Irie Hakō (1887–1948), Japanese painter
 Hako Isawa, a character in Japanese anime/manga Air Gear; see List of Air Gear characters#Hako Isawa
 Hako Natsuno, a main character in Japanese manga Meteor Prince

Places
 Hako, Aragatsotn, Armenia, a village
 Mount Hako, a mountain in the Kitami Mountains, Hokkaidō, Japan

Language
 Hakö language, an Austronesian language
 Hako, the Japanese word for "box"

Other uses
 Hako GmbH, a German tractor and street sweeper manufacturer
 Ngāti Hako, a Māori iwi of New Zealand
 Scion Hako Coupe, a 2004 Japanese-American concept subcompact hatchback
 Hako, a 2008 story game by Japanese video game company Illusion

See also
 Hoko (disambiguation)